Princess Ruth Keʻelikōlani Middle School (formerly Central Grammar School, Central Intermediate School, and Central Middle School) is a school of the Hawaii Department of Education that occupies a historic building in Honolulu, Hawaiʻi, built on the grounds of Keoua Hale, the former palace of Princess Ruth Keʻelikōlani of Hawaiʻi.

History
A large palace for Princess Ruth Keʻelikōlani was built on this site in 1878. After she died in 1883, her estate passed to her first cousin, Bernice Pauahi Bishop, who died in 1884. The palace, named Keoua Hale, was sold to the government to be used for educational purposes. In 1895, Honolulu High School (formerly Fort Street English Day School) classes were held there until 1907, when the school was renamed McKinley High School and relocated to a new building facing Thomas Square (later renamed Linekona School). Central Grammar School then took its place.

In 1920, Central Grammar School was designated a forerunner of what would become the "English Standard" type of public school. Soon thereafter, English-language exams were required for entrance. Plans for a new building were commissioned to accommodate the rapid growth of students going on to secondary schools during the booming 1920s. The palace was demolished, and the makai wing of the new building opened in 1925. (One can still see the name "Keelikolani School" engraved over the first-story windows on that side.) After the other two wings were completed in 1927, Central Grammar School became Central Junior High School, one of only six public secondary schools in Honolulu at the time. In 1932, all junior high schools were renamed intermediate schools.

2021 name change 

In 2021, Central Middle School was renamed to Princess Ruth Keʻelikōlani Middle School in honor of Keʻelikōlani. The effort to change the name began in 2019, and the change was approved by the Board of Education in September 2021.

Architecture
The original design of the school was drawn up in 1922 by the prominent architectural firm of Walter Emory and Marshall Webb, who also designed such notable buildings as the grand Tudor Revival residence of Charles M. Cooke Jr. (1912), the eclectic Indian-Western-style Honpa Hongwanji Hawaii Betsuin Buddhist Temple (1918), and the Neoclassical Revival and Art Deco Hawaii Theatre (1921). Their first design showed more influences of the Mediterranean Revival style that characterized many public buildings of that era, but they modified the plans in 1924 to add more Neoclassical Revival features, such as Ionic and Corinthian columns. This style was further enhanced by the Territorial building inspector at the time, Harry K. Stewart, a graduate of Central Grammar School who went on to design many other public buildings in the Territory, such as Baldwin High School and Molokai Public Library.

References

External links

Public schools in Honolulu
Public middle schools in Honolulu County, Hawaii
School buildings on the National Register of Historic Places in Hawaii
Hawaiian architecture
National Register of Historic Places in Honolulu